Joseph Mellick Leidy (September 9, 1823 – April 30, 1891) was an American paleontologist, parasitologist and anatomist.

Leidy was professor of anatomy at the University of Pennsylvania, later was a professor of natural history at Swarthmore College and the director of scientific and educational programs at the Wagner Free Institute of Science. His book Extinct Fauna of Dakota and Nebraska (1869) contained many species not previously described and many previously unknown on the North American continent. At the time, scientific investigation was largely the province of wealthy amateurs.

The Leidy Glacier in northwest Greenland was named by Robert Peary after him.

Early life and family 

Joseph Leidy was born on September 9, 1823, to an established Philadelphia family of Pennsylvania Germans. His father, Philip, was a hatter; his mother, Catharine, died during childbirth when he was young. His father then married his wife's first cousin, Christiana Mellick. Leidy also had a brother, Thomas Leidy. With the support of his stepmother and after overcoming the opposition of his father, who wanted him to be a sign painter, Leidy studied medicine at the University of Pennsylvania. He graduated with his medical degree in 1844.

He married Anna Harden, a woman who took a serious interest in his work and helped him with it on occasion. Their marriage was childless, and they eventually adopted an orphaned seven-year-old girl, Alwinia, daughter of the late Professor Franks of the University of Pennsylvania.

In 1848, he was elected a member of the American Philosophical Society.

Paleontology
Leidy named the holotype specimen of Hadrosaurus foulkii, which was recovered from the marl pits of Haddonfield, New Jersey. It was notable for being the first nearly complete fossilized skeleton of a dinosaur ever recovered. The specimen was originally discovered by William Parker Foulke. Leidy concluded, contrary to the view prevailing at the time, that this dinosaur could adopt a bipedal posture. He also described the holotype specimens of Arctodus (A. pristinus), the dire wolf (Aenocyon dirus), and the American lion (Panthera atrox), among many others. 

Noted American fossil collector and paleontologist E. D. Cope was a student of Leidy's, but the enmity and ruthless competition that developed between him and rival paleontologist O. C. Marsh eventually drove Leidy out of western American vertebrate paleontology, a field that Leidy had helped to found. Marsh claimed Leidy contributed to the falling out of the two by showing Cope in the presence of Marsh that Cope had mistakenly placed the head of a fossil Elasmosaurus on the tail, rather than on the neck, and then publishing a correction.

Leidy was an early American supporter of Darwin's theory of evolution, and lobbied successfully for Darwin's election to membership in the Academy of Natural Sciences of Philadelphia.

In 1852, Leidy referred Bison antiquus, the North American fossil bison, to the genus Bison, the first to do so. Sometimes called the "ancient bison", it was the most common large herbivore of the North American continent for over 10,000 years, and is a direct ancestor of the living American bison.

Leidy dominated vertebrate paleontology research in Florida during the latter half of the 19th century. He described and published the newly discovered species Smilodon floridanus.

The "Soap Lady" 

In 1875, a woman's body was exhumed from a Philadelphia cemetery; her body was encased in adipocere, a fatty substance that forms in warm, alkaline environments without exposure to oxygen. Examining her, Leidy originally reported that she had died in the 1793 Philadelphia yellow fever epidemic, but X-rays taken in 1987 showed that she had buttons on her body that weren't produced until the 1830s. Similarly, the body didn't have teeth, so Leidy thought the woman had died in middle or old age; however, a new set of X-rays in 2007 suggested that the woman had died in her late 20s.

Wagner Free Institute 
After William Wagner's death in 1885, the Wagner Free Institute of Science formed a board of trustees to find a new director. They chose Leidy to lead the institute, and he became president of the institute's faculty and curator of the museum. He held this position while remaining curator at the Academy of Natural Sciences and professor at Penn. Under Leidy's direction, the Wagner became a more professional institution for research and education. He formed the institute's professional journal "Transactions of the Wagner Free Institute of Science" and sponsored expeditions to collect specimens. One famed expedition to western Florida led by Angelo Heilprin led to the first discovery of a saber-toothed cat in North America. Leidy also led a large renovation to the building and dramatically reorganized the collection. The exhibition he designed opened in 1891, and displayed specimens based on taxonomy and systematics. Today, the Victorian cases and hand-labelled specimens remain almost unaltered since Leidy's reorganization in the late 19th century.

Other scientific fields
Leidy was also a renowned parasitologist, and determined as early as 1846 that trichinosis was caused by a parasite in undercooked meat. He was also a pioneering protozoologist, publishing Fresh-water Rhizopods of North America in 1879 – a work that is still referenced today.

Leidy collected gems as well as fossils, and donated his important collection of the former to the Smithsonian before he died. At Swarthmore, he also taught a class on mineralogy and geology.

Leidy served as a surgeon to Satterlee Military Hospital in Philadelphia during the American Civil War.

Forensic innovator
In 1846, Leidy became the first person ever to use a microscope to solve a murder mystery. A man accused of killing a Philadelphia farmer had blood on his clothes and hatchet. The suspect claimed the blood was from chickens he had been slaughtering. Using his microscope, Leidy found no nuclei in these erythrocytes (human erythrocytes are anucleate). Moreover, he found that if he let chick erythrocytes remain outside the body for hours, they did not lose their nuclei. Thus, he concluded that the blood stains could not have been chicken blood. The suspect subsequently confessed.

Bibliography
His bibliography includes 553 works.

Citations

References

External links 

 
 

1823 births
1891 deaths
American forensic scientists
American paleontologists
American parasitologists
American people of German descent
Lyell Medal winners
Perelman School of Medicine at the University of Pennsylvania alumni
Scientific illustrators
Scientists from Philadelphia
Swarthmore College faculty
University of Pennsylvania faculty
University of Pennsylvania Department of Biology faculty